John Gabriel is a fictional character, a superhero appearing in American comic books published by Marvel Comics. The character appears in the NEW-GEN comic books. Created by Chris Matonti, J.D. Matonti, and Julia Coppola, he first appeared in NEW-GEN #1 (2010). He is the founder and leader of the A.P.N.G., and the leading scientific mind in the field of nanotechnology on the world of New-Gen.

Fictional Character Biography

Utopia and Deadalus' Betrayal
Gabriel's long career in the creation and application of various kinds of nanotechnology on the world of New-Gen gained him a tremendous amount of success and admiration from the general populace. Through his technological advancements and careful cooperation with his wife, Thea (a guardian of the natural world), Gabriel revolutionized life on New-Gen, creating an almost utopian society. After taking on Sylvester Deadalus as an apprentice, Gabriel was able to create even more ways to make the quality of life more harmonious and comfortable for the general populace. However, unbeknownst to his mentor, Deadalus began to experiment on living things, pushing the envelope of nanotechnology and enhancing his subjects in unnatural ways. When Gabriel found out about this, he was furious and told Deadalus to stop immediately. However, Deadalus released onto the public of New-Gen, a swarm of nanobots he designed to alter the biological structure of those they infected. After the nanobots infected several children, mutating their bodies rapidly and giving them superpowers, Gabriel apprehended Deadalus and banished him to the underworld as punishment. Gabriel then sent his twin sons, Sean and Chris, to present-day New York City on Earth, to protect them from further attacks by Deadalus. Before he sent them there, Gabriel expressed concern that their bodies had also been affected by Deadalus' nanobot infestation.

Training the A.P.N.G.
After taking in the children whose bodies were affected by Deadalus' nanobots, Gabriel and Thea began to train them in the responsible use of their powers, with the end goal of forming a super-powered team to combat against those who would seek to threaten the lives of the innocent. Gabriel sent the oldest and best trained warrior, Mini and a combat robot, the Horus, to dispatch Deadalus after he resurfaced in ancient Crete and started wreaking havoc. When Mini had defeated Deadalus, Gabriel commanded Mini to banish Deadalus again, rather than kill him. Periodically, Gabriel checked in on his twin sons on Earth, who grew up not knowing their true father or mother. Thea often chastised Gabriel for the decision to send them to Earth, although she only did so privately, away from the eyes of the students.

Battle with Sly
When Deadalus emerged from the underworld onto Zadaar III, transformed by microbots into the insane and brutal Sly, Gabriel sent Mini to dispatch him again. However, it became evident very quickly that Mini was not strong enough to take out Sly's entire army of enhanced MetalMites by himself, so Gabriel teleported the remaining members of the team to help. As he watched Mini, Flyer, Gazelle, Diamond, and Roboduck fight Sly from his command center on New-Gen, Gabriel also noticed his sons having fitful visions of the battle. Gabriel prepared to depart and join the fray himself, carrying with him six green orbs containing highly advanced nanotechnology. Just before Gabriel arrived Sly shot the A.P.N.G. with a nanobot killing energy blast, leaving them powerless and weak. Gabriel, enraged, teleported to the battle and gave each member of the A.P.N.G. one of the green orbs, each of which transformed into a nano-glove, containing nanobots which restore their powers and strength. Gabriel then engaged Sly one on one, using his mastery of his own nanobot-given powers. After being overwhelmed at first, Gabriel fought back and eventually overcame Sly, banishing him for the third time to the underworld.

Powers, abilities, and equipment
Gabriel's powers stem from his complete mastery of the nanotechnology he has implanted within himself. He possess superhuman strength, the ability to emit powerful energy blasts, and telekinetic abilities (and by extension, flight). He is also able to teleport himself and others to any point in time and space instantaneously.

Gabriel also possesses a genius level intellect, and regularly creates both nanobots and large robots to perform specific, complex tasks. He also possesses the Kane, a large blue rod composed of nanobots that he can change the shape of according to his will. It also seems to serve as a means for him to focus or augment his powers, as well as weapon in physical combat, at which Gabriel excels.

References

External links 
 https://web.archive.org/web/20110707153446/http://apngenterprises.com/comic/characters-of-new-gen/
 http://www.comicvine.com/gabriel/29-69829/

Marvel Comics characters with superhuman strength